The Ukraine women's sevens team competes in the European Women's Sevens Championship and occasionally in other competitions. Ukraine were runners-up at the 2018 Rugby Europe Women's Sevens Trophy and were promoted to the Grand Prix Series for 2019.

Current squad
Squad to European Women's Sevens Series:
June 23–24, 2018 at Dnipro, Ukraine

References

External links
 Official cite RFU (Rugby Federation of Ukraine) 

Women's national rugby sevens teams
Rugby union in Ukraine